House of the Dying Sun, formerly Enemy Starfighter, is an action video game developed and published by Marauder Interactive. It was released on November 2, 2016 for Microsoft Windows and went through Steam's Early Access program prior to its full release. The game features optional virtual reality options that work with the HTC Vive and the Oculus Rift. The game contains fourteen scenarios that the player is able to complete, with the gameplay consisting of both first-person "cockpit combat" and an overlay in which the player is able to assume control of or give orders to ships in their fleet.

Reception

House of the Dying Sun has received a score of 76/100 on Metacritic based on 4 reviews, indicating "generally favorable" reviews.

Daniel Tack of Game Informer gave the game a score of 7.5/10, praising the gameplay and atmosphere but criticizing the game's short length.

See also
 Star Citizen

References

2016 video games
Action video games
Single-player video games
Video games developed in the United States
Windows games
Windows-only games